So Lucky may refer to:

So Lucky (Noël Akchoté album), 2007
So Lucky (Renée Geyer album) or the title song, 1981
"So Lucky" (song), by Zdob și Zdub, representing Moldova at Eurovision 2011

See also
"I Should Be So Lucky", a 1987 song by Kylie Minogue